Wimborne was a railway station in Wimborne Minster in the county of Dorset in England. Open from 1 June 1847 to 2 May 1977, it was sited just north of the River Stour in what is still Station Road. Built for the Southampton and Dorchester Railway, the station was operated from the start by the London and South Western Railway, which took over ownership in 1848. It was then operated by the Southern Railway (1923–47) and from 1948 by the Southern Region of British Railways which traded as British Rail from 1965.

Heyday
From the early-1860s until the mid-1880s, the station was a significant station in its own right on the Southampton and Dorchester Railway and the point of interchange for other lines. What in 1875-76 became the Somerset and Dorset Joint Railway ran from Wimborne Junction, just south of the station on the other side of river, initially (as the Dorset Central Railway) to Blandford (1860), then (as the Somerset and Dorset Railway) to Burnham in Somerset (1863) and finally to Bath (1874); Wimborne was the point of reversal for trains to and from Poole. The second route was the Salisbury and Dorset Junction Railway (1866), a minor line which branched off at West Moors; the station there was not opened until 1867, and goods traffic largely continued to be worked through to Wimborne and later beyond. The final new railway, branching off the original main line at New Poole Junction, was to Poole (1872) and onwards to Bournemouth (1874).

Decline
Bournemouth's rapid development in the late Victorian era as a residential town and holiday resort indirectly led to the decline of Wimborne station. The Somerset and Dorset avoided the awkward reversal there by opening a bypass from Corfe Mullen to Broadstone in 1885 (goods) and 1886 (passengers). A handful of local S&D passenger trains still ran into Wimborne as well as some goods trains as the large yard made for a more convenient point of interchange. Worse still came in 1888 when Wimborne was bypassed by the opening of a direct line to Bournemouth from the east. When that was extended in 1893 across Poole Harbour to join with the original Southampton and Dorchester line at Hamworthy Junction via the Holes Bay Curve - forming an alternative through-route between Southampton and Weymouth via Bournemouth - this meant that most main line passenger trains to and from London, Dorchester and Weymouth had no need to run through Wimborne.

Nevertheless, the generally increasing level of traffic on the railways up to 1914 meant that it was still a busy station, although post-war economies led to the withdrawal of most remaining S&D passenger trains from 11 July 1920 (just one train probably continued to run until 1922), followed by milk and parcels in February 1932, with freight traffic ceasing completely from 17 June 1933. Loss of the S&D traffic only left Wimborne with the infrequent pull-push services between Brockenhurst and Bournemouth West, a handful of trains from Salisbury and some long-distance Summer Saturday traffic when the station was used to relieve Bournemouth. This seasonal holiday traffic built up in the inter-war period and boomed in the 1950s. Goods trains also used the route all year around for the same reason.

Closure
In its final years the station suffered from an air of neglect, although photographic evidence suggests that the main buildings were kept in a decent state of repair into the early 1960s. Wimborne station closed to passengers on and from 4 May 1964 along with all others on the bypassed original line, an early casualty of the Beeching Axe programme of economies. Parcels and less-than-wagonload goods ceased from 28 February 1966 when sundries were concentrated on Bournemouth Central. This led to a rationalisation of Wimborne's track and signalling, although traffic was boosted from the late 1960s by the use of the down yard by TrainEx, a company fitting out exhibition trains. From 24 July 1966 siding working was introduced; the Down line towards Broadstone was taken out of use and services concentrated on the former Up line, although both tracks continued to be used in the Ringwood direction until the closure of the signalbox (which had remained as a ground frame) on 8 January 1967. At this point all remaining signals were removed and points converted to manual operation.

Goods trains continued to serve the station from Poole, running through to West Moors and Ringwood until August 1967. Thereafter traffic to Wimborne consisted mostly of coal and similar wagon loads, with the continued use of the line for an RAOC fuel depot just beyond West Moors keeping trains running through until the summer of 1974. The track north of Wimborne was lifted from October 1974, back to a point immediately south of Leigh Arch, the dangerously narrow and low bridge over what was then still the busy A31 road. This allowed the bridge to be demolished. For just over another 30 months, the occasional goods train disturbed the peace of Wimborne's decaying station, although by then the main reason for the line's survival was the use of the yard by TrainEx.

The site today
The site was until 2021 partly occupied by the weekly Wimborne Market while industrial and commercial units cover most of the rest. Much of the original embankment was removed in the mid-1980s, although it is not clear where the spoil was taken. Some oral accounts say it was used for construction of the Wimborne bypass (A31) while others suggest reclamation work in Poole Harbour near the town's railway station.

Services

References

Further reading
 J.S. Nicholas, 'Wimborne', The South Western Circular, vol.5 no.9 January  1982: 197–206.

External links
History of the Somerset and Dorset joint railway
Disused stations site record
Wimborne Station history
Wimborne station on navigable 1946 O. S. map
Wimborne and East Dorset Railways

Disused railway stations in Dorset
Former London and South Western Railway stations
Railway stations in Great Britain opened in 1847
Railway stations in Great Britain closed in 1964
Beeching closures in England
1847 establishments in England